Scobinichthys granulatus also known as the rough leatherjackets is a species of filefish native to the coastal waters of southern Australia. It lives on rocky reefs and in beds of seagrass.  This species grows to a length of  TL.  It is the only known member of the monotypic genus Scobinichthys.

References

Monacanthidae
Fish described in 1790
Fish of Australia
Taxa named by John White (surgeon)